Ted Linley may refer to: 
Ted Linley (footballer),
E. W. (Ted) Linley, a Canadian politician in Huron Shores, Ontario.